Mary Brennan (born May 1954) is an American politician.

Brennan was born May 1954 in Valparaiso, Florida.

Brennan previously served as a Representative in the House of Representatives of the U.S. state of Florida. She currently lives in Pinellas Park, Florida with her family.

Education
Brennan received her Bachelor's degree in journalism from the University of Florida in 1976.

External links
Official Website of Mary Brennan

University of Florida alumni
1954 births
Democratic Party members of the Florida House of Representatives
Living people
Women state legislators in Florida
People from Valparaiso, Florida